John Leon Pomorski (December 30, 1905 – December 6, 1977) was a pitcher in Major League Baseball. He played for the Chicago White Sox in 1934.

References

External links

1905 births
1977 deaths
Major League Baseball pitchers
Chicago White Sox players
Baseball players from New York (state)
Sportspeople from Brooklyn
Baseball players from New York City
American expatriate baseball players in Canada
Buffalo Bisons (minor league) players
Lawrence Merry Macks players
Montreal Royals players
Syracuse Chiefs players
Toronto Maple Leafs (International League) players
Trois-Rivières Renards players
Attleboro Burros players